REO Speedwagon is an American hard rock band from Champaign, Illinois. Formed in 1967, the group originally included drummer and backing vocalist Alan Gratzer, guitarist and lead vocalist Joe Matt, bassist and lead vocalist Mike Blair, and keyboardist Neal Doughty. Matt left early the next year after graduating from school, with Terry Luttrell taking his place on lead vocals. Bob Crownover took over as the band's guitarist, but was replaced after a brief tenure by Bill Fiorio and later Steve Scorfina. Blair left a few months after Matt, with Gregg Philbin taking his place. The band also briefly added saxophonist Joe McCabe and trumpeter Marty Shepard to its lineup in 1968.

By late 1970, REO Speedwagon had finalised its first recording lineup with the addition of guitarist Gary Richrath in place of Scorfina. In early 1972, shortly after the release of the band's self-titled debut album, Luttrell left REO Speedwagon following a disagreement with Richrath. The vocalist was replaced by Kevin Cronin, who performed on the group's second album R.E.O./T.W.O. before leaving during sessions for the 1973 follow-up. Mike Murphy took over and recorded Ridin' the Storm Out, Lost in a Dream and This Time We Mean It, but was replaced by a returning Cronin in 1976. Philbin left the following year, with Bruce Hall taking his place.

The band's lineup remained stable thereafter for more than ten years until Gratzer decided to retire in 1988, with Graham Lear brought in as his replacement. Richrath also left early the next year, with Miles Joseph filling in for a show before Dave Amato took over in May. Also in 1989, Bryan Hitt replaced Lear on drums, while Jesse Harms joined as a second keyboardist, performing on the band's 1990 album The Earth, a Small Man, His Dog and a Chicken. Since the end of Harms's brief tenure with the group, REO Speedwagon has retained a consistent lineup of Neal Doughty, Kevin Cronin, Dave Amato, Bruce Hall, and Bryan Hitt until 2023 when Doughty was replaced by former Iron Butterfly and Whitesnake member Derek Hilland.

Members

Current

Former

Timeline

Lineups

References

External links
REO Speedwagon official website

REO Speedwagon